You Ain't Seen the Last of Me is the ninth studio album by American actor and country music artist John Schneider. It was released in 1987 via MCA Records. The album includes singles "Love, You Ain't Seen the Last of Me", "When the Right One Comes Along" and "If It Was Anyone but You".

Track listing

Personnel
Adapted from liner notes.

Matt Betton – drums
Larry Byrom – electric guitar
Emory Gordy Jr. – bass guitar
John Barlow Jarvis – keyboards, piano, synthesizer
Mike Lawler – keyboards, synthesizer
Terry McMillan – harmonica
Fred Newell – electric guitar
John Schneider – lead vocals, background vocals, electric guitar
Billy Joe Walker Jr. – acoustic guitar, electric guitar
Curtis "Mr. Harmony" Young – background vocals
Reggie Young – electric guitar

Chart performance

References

1987 albums
John Schneider (screen actor) albums
Albums produced by Jimmy Bowen
MCA Records albums